Pyrgomantis pallida is a species of praying mantis found in Burkina Faso, Ghana, Guinea, Cameroon, Congo, Nigeria, and Togo.

See also
List of mantis genera and species

References

Pyrgomantis
Mantodea of Africa
Insects described in 1917